Ryehill may refer to:

Ryehill, East Riding of Yorkshire, England
Ryehill, Aberdeenshire, Scotland

See also
Ryhill